The Pueblo Bridge Co. is a firm that built a large number of bridges in the United States.  Several are listed on the U.S. National Register of Historic Places.

Works (attribution) include:
Avondale Bridge, built in 1913, Cty. Rd. 327, Avondale, CO (Pueblo Bridge Co.), NRHP-listed
Bridge over Fountain Creek, Rt. 24, Manitou Springs, CO (Pueblo Bridge & Construction Co.), NRHP-listed
EWZ Bridge over East Channel of Laramie River, Cty. Rd. CN8-204, Wheatland, WY (Pueblo Bridge Co.), NRHP-listed
F Street Bridge, F St., Salida, CO (Pueblo Bridge Co.), NRHP-listed
Huerfano Bridge, U.S. Hwy 50, Boone, CO (Pueblo Bridge Co.), NRHP-listed
Prowers Bridge, Cty. Rd. 34, Prowers, CO (Pueblo Bridge Co.), NRHP-listed, the last multispan truss bridge on the lower Arkansas River
Satank Bridge, Cty. Rd. 106, Carbondale, CO (Pueblo Bridge Co.), NRHP-listed
Wolcott Bridge, CO 131 at milepost 0.07, Wolcott, CO (Pueblo Bridge Company), NRHP-listed

References

Bridge companies
Construction and civil engineering companies of the United States
Construction and civil engineering companies established in 1913
American companies established in 1913
Manufacturing companies established in 1913